Llain-y-gawsai is a village and community in Llanbadarn Fawr, Ceredigion, Wales. It is 74.6 miles (120.1 km) from Cardiff and 178.8 miles (287.8 km) from London. It is represented in the Senedd by Elin Jones (Plaid Cymru) and the MP Ben Lake (Plaid Cymru).

References

See also 
 List of towns in Wales

Villages in Ceredigion